The following is a list of events affecting Philippine television in 1998. Events listed include television show debuts, finales, cancellations, and channel launches, closures and rebrandings, as well as information about controversies and carriage disputes.

Events
 June 12 - Philippine television channels broadcast the celebrations of the country's centennial year of independence.
 October 23 - ABS-CBN celebrated its 45th anniversary of Philippine television.
 Unknown date - GMA Network Inc. updated their logo with the returning of Where You Belong slogan.

Premieres

Unknown
 Kassandra on ABS-CBN 2
 Marisol on ABS-CBN 2
 Take Me Out of the Ball Game on IBC 13
 Stop Suffering on IBC 13
 Best Friends on GMA 7
 Zsa Zsa: A Limited Engagement on GMA 7
 Hiwalay Kung Hiwalay Daw on GMA 7
 Go For It! on ABC 5
 Clueless on ABC 5
 Relaks Lang on PTV 4
 Philippines' Most Wanted on PTV 4
 Speed by MP Turbo on PTV 4
 Sports Kids on PTV 4
 The Estrada Presidency on IBC 13
 PJM Forum on GMA 7/ZOE TV 11
 Jesus the Healer on ZOE TV 11
 The 700 Club Asia on ZOE TV 11
 The Flying House on ZOE TV 11
 Superbook on ZOE TV 11
 Daily Service Show on ZOE TV 11
 Movie Classics TV on ZOE TV 11
 Batang Batibot on GMA 7
 Magnegosyo on GMA 7
 TEXT (The Extreme Team) on GMA 7

Returning or renamed programs

Programs transferring networks

Finales
 January 4: ABCinema on ABC 5
 January 18: Rap 13 on IBC 13
 March 29: ATBP: Awit, Titik at Bilang na Pambata on ABS-CBN 2
 April 3: Ikaw Na Sana on GMA 7
 April 8:
 GMA Balita on GMA 7
 Good Morning Asia on GMA 7
 June 5: Katok Mga Misis on GMA 7
 June 6: ETChing: Entertainment Today with Lyn Ching on GMA 7
 June 13: Martin After Dark on ABS-CBN 2
 July 10:
 Headline Trese on IBC 13
 CTN Midnite on IBC 13
 August 7: Ganyan Kita Kamahal on GMA 7
 August 30: Compañero y Compañera on ABS-CBN 2
 September 18: News 23 on Studio 23
 October 2: Calvento Files on ABS-CBN 2
 October 16: Marisol on ABS-CBN
 October 30:
 Pangunahing Balita Ala-Una on PTV 4
 Pangunahing Balita on PTV 4
 PTV News on PTV 4
 PTV Newsbreak on PTV 4
 November 3: The Inside Story on ABS-CBN 2
 November 8: Onli in da Pilipins on ABS-CBN 2
 November 9: Palibhasa Lalake on ABS-CBN 2
 November 28: 'Sang Linggo nAPO Sila on ABS-CBN 2
 December 26:
 Coney Reyes on Camera on ABS-CBN 2
 Citiline (ABS-CBN 2)

Unknown dates
 May: Action 9 on RPN 9

Unknown
 Si Tsong, Si Tsang on GMA 7
 Public Life with Randy David on GMA  7
 PSE Live: The Stock Market Today on SBN 21
 Business and Leisure on ABS-CBN 2
 Bahay at Bahay on IBC 13
 Magandang Umaga Ba? on IBC 13
 Mahal on IBC 13
 Take Me Out of the Ball Game on IBC 13
 Details 0923 on IBC 13
 Stop Suffering on IBC 13
 Walang Kukurap on GMA 7
 Zsa Zsa: A Limited Engagement on GMA 7
 Ibang Klase on GMA 7
 Si Manoy at si Mokong on GMA 7
 Negosiete: Mag-Aral sa GMA on GMA 7
 Agrisiete on GMA 7
 Philippines for Jesus Presents on GMA 7
 Tinig sa Itaas on GMA 7
 Love Notes on ABC 5
 Music Bureau on ABC 5
 Spiritual Vignettes on RPN 9
 Wake Up Call on RPN 9
 Let's Dance with Becky Garcia on RPN 9
 Sky Ranger Gavan on RPN 9
 Jetman on RPN 9
 The Final Report on PTV 4
 FVR Up Close on PTV 4/RPN 9/IBC 13
 Ang Pangarap Kong Jackpot on PTV 4
 Viva Drama Specials on PTV 4
 The Message on IBC 13
 Maskman on IBC 13
 Viva Spotlight on GMA 7

Channels

Launches
 April 13 - ZOE TV
 November 5 - Nickelodeon (Southeast Asia)

Births
January 4 - Liza Soberano, actress
January 6 – Carla Buhain, actress, model and singer 
January 10 - Ayra Mariano, actress
January 16 - Crystal Paras, actress and singer
February 10 - Donny Pangilinan, actor
February 24 - Mariel Pamintuan, actress
March 14 - Elaine Duran, singer
March 27 - BJ Forbes, actor
March 30 - Janella Salvador, actress and singer
April 16 - Paul Salas, actor
May 4 – Camille Trinidad, vlogger
May 15 – Kokoy de Santos, actor, singer, dancer and commercial model
May 18 - Eunice Lagusad, actress
May 22 – Jai Asuncion, vlogger
May 29 - Riva Quenery, actress, vlogger, singer and dancer
June 11 - Sandy Talag, actress and dancer
June 27 - Franco Rodriguez, actor, dancer and TV Host
August 1 - Barbie Imperial, actress
August 4 – Jayzam Manabat, vlogger
August 11 - Claire Castro, actress
August 19 - Ella Guevara, actress
September 21 - Miguel Tanfelix, actor
October 10 - Nash Aguas, actor
October 11 - Carlmalone Montecido, singer
October 23 - Lawrence Emmeline Fernandez - actress, dancer and TV Host
November 10 - Renz Valerio, actor
November 11 - Carlo Lacana, actor
November 22 - Jane De Leon, actress and dancer
December 2 - Gabbi Garcia, actress and endorser
December 9 - Mika Dela Cruz, actress
December 11 – Zeinab Harake, vlogger
December 15 - Nichole Barranda, actress and dancer
December 25 – Jose Emmanuel Martinez, comic book expert
December 26 - Ashley Ortega, actress 
December 28 - Aaron Junatas, actor

Deaths
January 9 - Charito Solis, actress (b. 1935)
August 27 - Babalu, actor and comedian (b. 1942)
September 6 - Ric Segreto, recording artist (b. 1952)

See also
1998 in television

References

 
Television in the Philippines by year
Philippine television-related lists